Peak Charles National Park is a national park in Western Australia,  east of Perth and  north west of Esperance.

The park is named for one of the main features, Peak Charles, which is an ancient granite peak with an elevation of 
that dominates the park along with its neighbour Peak Eleanora. Both afford excellent views over the park, which is primarily composed of dry sand plain heaths and salt lake systems.

It is located within the IBRA sub region of the Eastern Mallee and has a number of rare plants within its boundaries including Gastrolobium acrocaroli.

No entry fee applies to enter the park but there are few facilities available to tourists. A car park, campground and toilets are available.

A  looped walk trail to a lookout at the top of Peak Charles is also available which requires rock scrambling.

See also
 Protected areas of Western Australia

References 

National parks of Western Australia
Protected areas established in 1979
Goldfields-Esperance
1979 establishments in Australia
Great Western Woodlands